The Medway Av8R is a British ultralight trike designed and produced by Medway Microlights. The aircraft is supplied fully factory-built.

Design and development
The Av8R is certified to the British BCAR Section "S" standard. It features a cable-braced hang glider-style high-wing, weight-shift controls, a two-seats-in-tandem open cockpit, tricycle landing gear and a single engine in pusher configuration.

The aircraft is made from tubing, with its double-surface Raven wing covered in Dacron sailcloth. Its  span wing is supported by a single tube-type kingpost and uses an "A" frame control bar. The carriage features a cockpit fairing with a windshield and wheel spats. The seats and engine mount are fixed and the wing's mast folds down into a slot in the carriage for rigging and storage. Hydraulic brakes are standard equipment. The engines available are the four-cylinder, four-stroke  Rotax 912UL and the  Rotax 912ULS.

Specifications (AV8R)

References

External links

2000s British ultralight aircraft
Single-engined pusher aircraft
Ultralight trikes